Dean Karr (born February 22, 1965) is an American photographer and director. A prolific creative, Karr has photographed dozens of album covers and directed a substantial amount of music videos, commercials, and films.

Early life and education 
A native of Seattle, Washington, Karr received a Bachelor of Fine Arts from Washington State University. After moving to Los Angeles, he attended the Art Center College of Design in Pasadena, California.

Career 
Karr's early work in the arts led to him being asked to direct the music video for Marilyn Manson's cover of Sweet Dreams (Are Made of This).

Recent clients have included: Trident Gum (Saatchi & Saatchi), LG Phones (Alcone), Busch Gardens/SeaWorld Entertainment (Momentum), Palms Hotels (S+K Group), Mazda Automobiles (Foote, Cone & Belding), Woolrich (Siquis, Ltd.), Mortal Kombat (DDB Needham), and eight annual campaigns for Universal Studios and Coca-Cola's Halloween Horror Nights (David & Goliath Agency).

Karr has worked with artists on their respective music videos, including Evanescence, Lisa Marie Presley, The Dave Matthews Band, X-Japan, Stevie Nicks, Willie Nelson, Velvet Revolver, Damian Marley, Ozzy Osbourne, Cypress Hill, Tommy Lee, Everlast, Dr. Dre, Queens of the Stone Age, Godsmack, and Iron Maiden.

His commercial print campaigns include: Universal Studios, HBO, Tommy Hilfiger, Busch Gardens, Astrella Designs and the National Ad Council. His entertainment print work includes artists such as: Chris Rock, T-Pain, Tool, Marilyn Manson, Lenny Kravitz, Busta Rhymes, AC/DC, Tommy Lee, Undercover Slut and Three Doors Down. Karr's art photography has been the subject of exhibitions at museums and galleries, including: LACMA Los Angeles County Museum of Art; Art Modern Gallery, Moscow; Institute of Actual Art, Kiev; and the prestigious Merry Karnowsky Gallery in Los Angeles."

Karr is currently represented by Mirror Films for broadcast commercials and new media, Wild Indigo for video and film, and Grannyfinger for photography.

Photography, printwork and other designs

Album art

Music videos

Feature-length DVDs and films
"Welcome to the House of Shock" (2012) Currently in Post-Production
"Las Meninas" (co-directed with Ihor Podolchak) (2008)
"Still Reigning" by Slayer (2004)
"Rock in Rio" by Iron Maiden (2002)

Commercials
 Best Buy/Ncompass "4K" (2014)
 Best Buy "Game On Santa"
 Dark-Hunter "Acheron"
 Palms Casino Resort
 Buy.com (featuring singer Dirty Harry)
 Universal Orlando (Halloween Horror Nights)
 Universal Hollywood
 K'Nex
 LG Nitro HD Cellular
 Mortal Kombat
 Mazda
 Hasbro Bio Bots
 Hasbro Hit Clips
 Woolrich
 Seaworld
 Sankyo Games
 St. Martin's Press
Busch Gardens
Coca-Cola

Producer or executive producer
"Disciples of the 36 Chambers, Chapter 2" by Wu-Tang Clan
"Rude Awakening" by Megadeth

References

External links
 

 Mirror Films
 Wild Indigo
  Music Videography at Music Video Database
  Artist Page at Merry Karnowsky Gallery
  Juxtapose Article
  Swindle Magazine Article

American photographers
American music video directors
Artists from Seattle
1965 births
Living people
Washington State University alumni
American film directors
Advertising directors